Tucker is a small lunar impact crater in the southern part of the Mare Smythii. It is located along the eastern limb of the Moon, and from the Earth it is seen nearly from the edge. It lies between the slightly larger crater Lebesgue to the northeast and the flooded Kao to the south-southwest.

This is a small, circular crater formation that is cup-shaped and has a higher albedo than the surrounding dark lunar mare. It is one of the brighter features in the surroundings, which is indicative of a relatively youthful feature that has not undergone significant space weathering. The crater is not significantly eroded or overlain by craters of significance.

References

 
 
 
 
 
 
 
 
 
 
 
 

Impact craters on the Moon